Doryssus or Dorissus or Doriagus was a king of ancient Sparta, who reigned for 29 years. Pausanias identified him as the son of Labotas or Leobotes and the father of Agesilaus I. He was killed in battle between the Spartans and the Argives.

References

9th-century BC Greek people
9th-century BC rulers
Agiad kings of Sparta
Ancient Greeks killed in battle